114 (one hundred [and] fourteen) is the natural number following 113 and preceding 115.

In mathematics
114 is an abundant number, a sphenic number and a Harshad number. It is the sum of the first four hyperfactorials, including H(0). At 114, the Mertens function sets a new low of -6, a record that stands until 197.
114 is the smallest positive integer* which has yet to be represented as a3 + b3 + c3, where a, b, and c are integers. It is conjectured that 114 can be represented this way. (*Excluding integers of the form 9k ± 4, for which solutions are known not to exist.)
There is no answer to the equation φ(x) = 114, making 114 a nontotient.
114 appears in the Padovan sequence, preceded by the terms 49, 65, 86 (it is the sum of the first two of these).
114 is a repdigit in base 7 (222).

See also
 114 (disambiguation)

References

Integers